Joacim Tuuri (born 16 October 1989) is a Finnish footballer who represents Vaasan Palloseura of Veikkausliiga.

References
Guardian Football
Veikkausliiga

1989 births
Finnish footballers
Vaasan Palloseura players
Veikkausliiga players
Living people
Association football midfielders
Sportspeople from Vaasa